The Others is a novel by Alison Prince published in 1986.

Plot summary
The Others is a novel in which people are physically and mentally programmed for their jobs, in a post-holocaust setting.

Reception
Dave Langford reviewed The Others for White Dwarf #82, and stated that "Not desperately convincing in its resolution [...] but otherwise it's tense and gritty stuff. Rather than being miraculously preserved to the final, likable characters can die."

Reviews
Review by Sue Thomason (1987) in Vector 136
Review by Ken Brown (1987) in Interzone, #19 Spring 1987

References

1986 novels